Scammonin (also known as jalapin or scammonium) is a glycoside that has been isolated from the stems of Ipomoea purga (jalap plant) and from Convolvulus scammonia (scammony).

References

External links 

Glycosides
Glycolipids

de:Skammonium